Viktor Sulčič (1895 - 1973), also known as Víctor (or Victorio) Sulcic, was a Slovenian born Art Deco architect in Argentina. 

He was born in 1895 in Križ (in Italian Santa Croce) near Trieste. He completing his studies of architecture in Florence and Bologna.

Sulčič emigrated to Argentina in 1924. He joined two other architects there: José Luis Delpini and Raúl Bes. The two most famous buildings designed by the trio, are located in Buenos Aires: the Abasto market, completed in 1934, and Boca Juniors stadium La Bombonera, completed in 1940.

Other works by Viktor Sulcic include a collection of water colours depicting South American landscapes and poems written in Spanish.

He died in 1973 in Buenos Aires.

Viktor Sulcic was married to Anna Kiselicki, a piano teacher, native of Vranjevo near Novi Bečej in Serbia. They had two sons: Fedor and Hector Igor Sulcic.

External links
In Spanish:
 An article about Abasto market from La Nación
 A description of Balvanera district, including a paragraph about Abasto
 A description about La Boca district, including a few words about La Bombonera stadium

1895 births
Naturalized citizens of Argentina
1973 deaths
Architects from Buenos Aires
Architects from Trieste
Italian emigrants to Argentina
Art Deco architects
Burials at La Chacarita Cemetery